Frank Noon (born 25 December 1959 in London) is a British drummer who played with the bands Def Leppard and Roadhouse.

Career
Frank Noon was a member of the trio The Next Band before, during, and after the time he was in Def Leppard, and played on The Next Band's Four by Three E.P. Noon played on Def Leppard's The Def Leppard E.P. in 1979. Noon was never an official member of Def Leppard. Although he was asked to join permanently, he declined the offer to stay with The Next Band. He was preceded in Def Leppard by original drummer Tony Kenning and succeeded by current drummer Rick Allen.

About thirteen years later, he played in the band Roadhouse with Pete Willis, who was a member of Def Leppard when Noon performed with them. He played on Roadhouse's demo, but was replaced by drummer Trevor Brewis before the recording of Roadhouse's album.

Noon also played drums for various other bands including Lionheart, Wild Fire, Wild Horses (not to be confused with an American band of the same name), Stampede, Waysted, Di'anno, More, and Crazy Lesbians.

Discography

With The Next Band
 Four by Three EP (1978)

With Def Leppard
 The Def Leppard E.P. (1979)

With Bernie Tormé and the Electric Gypsies
 Shoorah Shoorah (1982)

With Waysted
 Vices (1983)

With Roadhouse
 demo

References

Def Leppard
Wild Horses (British band) members
Living people
Place of birth missing (living people)
English rock drummers
English heavy metal drummers
Waysted members
1959 births